Tanner Smith  (c. 1887-1919) was an American criminal gang leader

Tanner Smith may also refer to:

 Tanner Smith (basketball) (born 1990), American basketball player
 Tanner Smith (footballer) (born 1994), Australian footballer